Karapa is a village in Kakinada district in the state of Andhra Pradesh in India.

Geography
Karapa has an average elevation of 3 meters (13 feet).

References 

Villages in Kakinada district